The Nationalist Party of Canada is a Canadian white supremacist organization founded in 1977 by Don Andrews. The party describes itself as white nationalist and is known for its antisemitic and racist publications.

History 
The Nationalist Party was founded by Andrews after he was legally barred by his bail conditions from associating with the Western Guard, another white supremacist organization. The party was briefly known as the National Citizens Alliance. It had an estimated 150 to 300 members in the mid-1980s.

From 1977 to 1985, the party published The Nationalist Report, which ceased publication when Andrews and Party Secretary Robert Smith were charged and convicted under the Criminal Code for promoting hatred. Crown attorney Michel Anne MacDonald described the journal as containing anti-black, anti-Jewish and anti-Asian articles, and the presiding judge described the "degree of hatred" in their journal as "obscene". He added that Andrews was the "directing mind of the publication" and described Smith as a "faithful, industrious follower".

In 1986, Andrews and Smith endorsed Holocaust denier Jim Keegstra's bid to lead the Social Credit Party of Canada. The two men appealed to the Supreme Court of Canada in 1989, seeking to have their conviction overturned. The court rejected the appeal in December 1990, ruling that the Canadian Charter of Rights and Freedoms did not protect hate speech in R v Andrews and R v Keegstra.  Andrews and Smith served jail terms following the ruling.

The Nationalist Party continues to further its goals through supporting such projects as "European Heritage Week" (commemorated every October beginning on the Canadian observance of Thanksgiving) and a shortwave radio program. It also originated and operates the "Canadian Flag Perpetual Pride Campaign" each year during the months of July and December, where residences in cities and towns in Canada, and governments at the federal, provincial and municipal levels are encouraged to properly display new Canadian flags and to replace worn ones; this campaign has been extended to encourage Canadian flag displays at offices and stores of major Canadian corporations such as Canadian Tire, Unilever and Loblaws/Weston.

Andrews has run for Mayor of Toronto several times, including in 2003 when he won 0.17 percent of the vote. In that year, two other party members ran unsuccessfully for Toronto City Council.

Party candidates

Bob Smith 
Robert Wayne Smith is a frequent candidate for political office, and has sought election at the municipal, provincial and federal levels. Like Don Andrews, he was originally a member of the Western Guard Party. He first ran for the Toronto School Board in 1972, when he was still a student. His most recent campaign was for Mayor of Toronto in 2006. During his Western Guard days, he was the voice for its White Power Phone Message. Among organizations he has served in include the Canadian Anti-Soviet Action Committee, the Ontario Social Credit organization, as a director of the Ezra Pound Institute for International Studies, and as a guest commentator during the 1990s for the British Peoples' League Hour radio program. Today, he regularly blogs at his Internet column on the Nationalist Party website page, "Bob's Beat".

See also 
 James Alexander McQuirter
 Wolfgang Droege

Notes

References

Citations

Sources

Journal articles

Reports

News articles

External links 
 

Nationalist parties in Canada
Political parties established in 1977
White supremacist groups in Canada